The 32nd Yukon Legislative Assembly began on October 10, 2006. The Yukon Party Government led by Dennis Fentie was sustained holding a small majority of seats.

Membership in the 32nd Assembly

Standings changes since the 2006 general election

Membership changes

References

External links
Yukon Legislature

Yukon Legislative Assemblies
Lists of people from Yukon
Yukon politics-related lists